Bernard Edward Brandt (February 20, 1881 – February 19, 1954) was an American farmer and politician.

Born in Forest Junction, Wisconsin, Brandt was a farmer in the town of Spruce, Wisconsin in Oconto County, Wisconsin. He served as chairman and treasurer of the Town of Spruce. He also served on the Oconto County Board of Supervisors. In 1935, Brandt served in the Wisconsin State Assembly on the Wisconsin Progressive Party ticket. Brandt died in Green Bay on February 19, 1954.

References

1881 births
1954 deaths
People from Brillion, Wisconsin
People from Oconto County, Wisconsin
Farmers from Wisconsin
County supervisors in Wisconsin
Mayors of places in Wisconsin
Wisconsin Progressives (1924)
Members of the Wisconsin State Assembly
20th-century American politicians